Houston Express may refer to:

 Houston Express (ship), a cargo ship
 Houston Express (soccer), a soccer club based in Houston, Texas
 Houston Express (album), a 1971 album by Houston Person